Seetanah Lutchmeenaraidoo, most commonly known as Vishnu Lutchmeenaraidoo (born on 24 May 1944) is a former Deputy Prime Minister and Minister of Finance of Mauritius.

Background and education
Vishnu Lutchmeenaraidoo completed his secondary education at New Eton College and College St-Joseph. He then studied in France, obtaining a Master in Business Administration at Aix-Marseilles University and a post graduate qualifications in Export Marketing at the Ecole Superieure de Commerce-Marseilles.

Political career
Vishnu Lutchmeenaraidoo was Deputy Prime Minister and Minister of Finance from 1983 to 1990. He was also Member of Parliament as from December 2014 to 11 December 2015, Minister of Finance and Economic Development from 15 December 2014 to 14 March 2016. From 14 March 2016 to 21 March 2019 he held the portfolio of Minister of Foreign Affairs, Regional Integration and International Trade before his resignation.

References

Members of the National Assembly (Mauritius)
1944 births
Living people
Mauritian people of Indian descent
Militant Socialist Movement politicians
Mauritian Hindus
Labour Party (Mauritius) politicians
Ministers of Finance of Mauritius
Grand Commanders of the Order of the Star and Key of the Indian Ocean